Hotel America is a 1981 French romantic drama film directed by André Téchiné, starring Catherine Deneuve and Patrick Dewaere. The film, set in Biarritz, tells the ill-fated romance of mismatched lovers. This is the first of several collaborations between Téchiné and Deneuve, who became his favorite actress.

Plot
Hélène, an anesthetist working in Biarritz, while driving home one night nearly hits a pedestrian. The two go for a coffee and end up spending the night in a diner so that she can file a report, but Gilles Tisserand, the pedestrian, has fallen in love with her by the next morning. He asks her for a date, and while she accepts, she remains coldly indifferent toward him.

Unfulfilled and aimless, Gilles has recently come back from a trip to New York, bringing with him, Bernard, a friend he met there. Bernard is an unemployed aspiring musician and would-be serial seducer whose only real occupation is to enjoy the moment and spend time with his steady girlfriend, Colette, a cheerful post office clerk worker. Gilles’s mother runs the Hotel de la Gare with his younger sister, Elise. This fact makes life uncomplicated for the two friends who live for free at the hotel. Bernard would like to seduce Elise, a heavy reader who never goes out and repeatedly turns him down.

Keen about his developing relationship with Hélène, Gilles invites her to a restaurant at the local casino with Bernard and Colette. The occasion ends up in discord. Hélène clearly dislikes Bernard’s attitude and Gilles confronts her. Bernard is his friend and Gilles is disappointed with her air of superiority. He backs off from the relationship suspecting that she could never really love someone less well off than her. Gilles’s disenchantment has the opposite effect on Hélène and she is unable to let him go. Hélène looks for him and they eventually sleep together in his mother's hotel, initiating a serious relationship.

Gilles finds a job as a tourist guide and paints Hélène beachfront apartment. However, her past comes to haunt their relationship. She is still mourning the death of her former lover, an architect who drown in Biarritz more than a year ago. It was in fact his tragic death that brought her to Biarritz, where she has few friends: Jacqueline the waitress at the cafe by the station where she had her first encounter with Gilles and Rudel, an older surgeon and who like Jacqueline is a frequent gambler at the casino. Many years ago Hélène and Rudel were lovers and he introduced her to the architect. Hélène has inherited La Salamandre, a big abandoned house outside town, where the architect was planning to live. The house is still in disrepair, but after taking Gilles there he insists on leaving the beachfront apartment and move to La Salamandre.

Bernard had an argument with Gilles about Hélène. Cruising at night in a park, Bernard encounters Luc, Collette’s gay friend, and coworker, who attempts to pick him up, but he is assaulted by Bernard, as a result. A subsequent police investigation discovers stolen items in Bernard’s hotel room. Bernard is arrested and has to spend some time in jail, to Colette’s dismay.

Moving to La Salamandre proves to be a bad idea as the place is cold and far from town. Living there only complicates the relationship. As Hélène starts to warm up to Gilles over time and opens up her personal life, he becomes increasingly temperamental, displaying a possessive and unpredictable personality that threatens to drive them apart just as they are getting closer. He proposed to make a trip to London but backs down at the last moment. Moody and unstable, Gilles gets drunk and makes a scene by the beach. While Hélène, is looking after him, he slaps her. This furthers Hélène's disillusionment towards Gilles. She decides to leave Biarritz behind and return to Paris. Once on the train, she tears up a photo of Gilles, but she is unable to bring herself to throw it out the windows.

Gilles has once again dreams of leaving town with Bernard, who has been released from jail and wants to leave Biarritz.  The Hotel de la Gare has been renamed Hôtel des Amériques by its new owner. At the hotel"s reopening party, Colette ends in tears when Luc tells her that Bernard has left town with some money he gave him after he forgave him for the beating. Also at the party, Elise meets Rudel, they start to chat and she gives him a kiss. Gilles learns from Elise that Hélène has returned permanently to Paris. He runs to the train station but he has to wait for the next day to catch the next train to Paris to see Hélène again. He spends the night rehearsing what he would tell her while tears wet his face.

Cast
 Catherine Deneuve as Hélène
 Patrick Dewaere as Gilles  
 Étienne Chicot as Bernard
 Josiane Balasko as Colette
 Dominique Lavanant as Jacqueline
 Sabine Haudepin as Elise
 François Perrot as Rudel 
 Frédérique Ruchaud as mother
 Jean-Louis Vitrac as Luc

Analysis
Hotel America quickly establishes the free-flowing narrative structure that Téchiné has become known for. Hélène and Gilles' relationship does not follow the conventional path of romantic films, instead carrying the unpredictability of real romantic struggles. Téchiné allowed his actors to improvise during shooting, and this lends the scenes spontaneity and a natural sense of awkwardness.

DVD release
The film was released on DVD on 22 July 2008 in the United States as part of a box set of Téchiné's films. The film is in French  with English subtitles. Hotel America is also available in Region 2 DVD.

References

Further reading

External links
 
 
 

1981 films
1981 romantic drama films
1980s French-language films
Films directed by André Téchiné
Films produced by Alain Sarde
Films scored by Philippe Sarde
Films set in France
Films set in hotels
Films shot in France
French romantic drama films
1980s French films